Arctostaphylos franciscana, known by the common name Franciscan manzanita, is a species of manzanita. It was named by Alice Eastwood and is native to the city of San Francisco.

Taxonomy
Franciscan manzanita was formerly considered as a subspecies of Hooker's manzanita until elevated to full species rank following modern genetic analysis and comparisons.

Conservation
When the Laurel Hill Cemetery in San Francisco was bulldozed in 1947, it was thought that the Arctostaphylos franciscana went extinct. In 2009, one wild specimen of the shrub was discovered in the Presidio by a local conservationist. Less than a month later, Caltrans transplanted this specimen to make way for the Doyle Drive Replacement Project. 

The U.S. Fish and Wildlife Service designated the Franciscan manzanita as an endangered species on October 5, 2012. The National Park Service and Golden Gate National Parks Conservancy are attempting to cross-pollinate and propagate the preserved specimen in order to reintroduce the subspecies in the wild.

References

External links
 Conservation: Arctostaphylos hookeri ssp. franciscana

franciscana
Endemic flora of California
Natural history of the California chaparral and woodlands
Natural history of the San Francisco Bay Area
Natural history of San Francisco
Endemic flora of the San Francisco Bay Area